Letterston railway station served the parish of Letterston, Pembrokeshire, Wales, from 1895 to 1965 on the North Pembrokeshire and Fishguard Railway.

History 
The station opened on 11 April 1895 by the North Pembrokeshire and Fishguard Railway. It was situated on the east side of Station Road. To the opposite of the platform was a goods yard which had six sidings and a goods shed. When services to Clynderwen were stopped in 1917, Letterston stayed open for diverted services from Fishguard to Neyland. This didn't last long and the track was later lifted and taken to France. The normal services resumed on 9 July 1923. The signal box closed in 1926 and was replaced by a ground frame. The station closed on 25 October 1937. It remained open for goods traffic until 1 March 1965.

References

External links 

Disused railway stations in Pembrokeshire
Railway stations in Great Britain opened in 1895
Railway stations in Great Britain closed in 1937
1895 establishments in Wales
1965 disestablishments in Wales